Trifurcula headleyella is a moth of the  family Nepticulidae. It is found in all Europe, with the possible exception of Ireland and the Mediterranean islands

The wingspan is 4.2–5.8 mm.

The larvae feed on Prunella grandiflora, Prunella laciniata and Prunella vulgaris. They mine the leaves of their host plant. The mine consists of a very long corridor, often following the midrib or the leaf margin, widening in the end into an irregular elongate blotch. The larva may move to another or even a third leaf (all the while mining) by way of the petioles and stem. Pupation takes place outside of the mine.

External links
Swedish Moths
bladmineerders.nl

Nepticulidae
Moths of Europe
Moths described in 1854